The Color of the Clouds is a 1997 Spanish drama film directed by Mario Camus which stars Julia Gutiérrez Caba, Ana Duato, Antonio Valero, and José María Doménech.

Plot 
The plot revolves around a house in a Cantabrian village owned by Doña Lola, from which a series of intertwined subplots spawn. Lola and her niece Clementina agree on hosting a Bosnian refugee child (sabotaged by impostor kid Bartolomé), an old fisherman and Lola's friend (Colo) finds a drug cache nearby, the former house owner's son tries to evict Lola, and Clementina develops a romance with a lawyer (Valerio).

Cast

Production 
The film was produced by Urbana Films alongside Sogepaq. It was shot in Cantabria.

Release 
Selected in the 45th San Sebastián International Film Festival's official selection, the film premiered in September 1997. Distributed by Lauren Films, it was theatrically released in Spain on 3 October 1997.

Reception 
Jonathan Holland of Variety deemed the film to be Camus' best for some years, "a complex but uncomplicated, lyrical but hard-edged adventure-cum-mood piece, with the kind of luminous maturity and compassion to seduce offshore arthouse auds".

Ángel Fernández-Santos of El País considered that Camus manages to "firmly hold on a fairly complex but fragile storyline", with the result of a "noble and solid Spanish film".

Accolades 

|-
| rowspan = "6" align = "center" | 1998 || rowspan = "6" | 12th Goya Awards || Best Actress || Julia Gutiérrez Caba ||  || rowspan = "6" | 
|-
| Best Supporting Actor || Antonio Valero || 
|-
| Best New Actress || Blanca Portillo || 
|-
| Best Cinematography || Jaume Peracaula || 
|-
| Best Editing || José María Biurrun || 
|-
| Best Art Direction || Antonio Cortés || 
|}

See also 
 List of Spanish films of 1997

References 

Films shot in Cantabria
Films set in Cantabria
1997 drama films
Spanish drama films
1990s Spanish-language films
Films directed by Mario Camus
1990s Spanish films